Yisrael Friedman (November 8, 1923 – May 1, 2017) was known as the Pashkaner Rebbe (after the city of Pașcani where his grandfather served as Rebbe). He was a lecturer at the Tel Aviv University and the Ben-Gurion University of the Negev and the rosh yeshiva of a hesder yeshiva in Netivot.

Friedman was a sixth-generation descendant of Rebbe Yisrael of Rizhin. He resided in the southern Jerusalem neighborhood of Gilo. He was married to Rebbetzin Tziporah, a daughter of the Imrei Chaim of Vizhnitz. One of his sons is Hoshea Friedman, a brigadier general in the IDF. The Rebbe's grandsons study in various hesder yeshivos.
On Monday, May 1, 2017, Rebbi Friedman died at the age of 93, leaving behind his wife, Rebbetzin Tziporah, his successor Rabbi Hoshea Friedman-Ben Shalom, three other sons and one daughter.

References 

1923 births
2017 deaths
Israeli Rosh yeshivas
People from Buhuși
Rebbes of Ruzhin
Israeli people of Romanian-Jewish descent
Romanian emigrants to Israel
Romanian Orthodox rabbis
Vizhnitz (Hasidic dynasty)
Academic staff of Ben-Gurion University of the Negev
Academic staff of Tel Aviv University
Descendants of the Baal Shem Tov
Burials at Nahalat Yitzhak Cemetery